Jothimani Sennimalai  (born 9 August 1975), also known mononymously as Jothimani, is an Indian politician, writer, and social worker. A member of the Indian National Congress, she was elected to the Lok Sabha from Karur, Tamil Nadu in 2019. Having joined politics at a young age, Jothimani served separate terms as the General Secretary and Vice President of Indian Youth Congress and Tamil Nadu Youth Congress respectively.

Early life and education 
Jothimani was born on 9 August 1975 at Periya Thirumangalam, Aravakurichi, Karur District to Sennimalai and Muthulakshmi. Her father Sennimalai was a farmer. She lost her father Sennimalai in her childhood. With the support of her mother Muthulakshmi, she completed her Graduation at Sri G.V.G Visalakshi College for Women, Udumalaipet. During her college days, she was elected as Chair of College Students Union. She was an active participant in the NSS Camps in college and took part in social service activities.

Her academic degrees include: Master of Arts, Annamalai University, 2003; and Master of Philosophy, Annamalai University, 2005.

Political career

Early career
Jothimani enter the field of politics at her age of 22. She was an active worker in Indian Youth Congress and a close associate of the Indian National Congress president Rahul Gandhi.

She was Member of Tamil Nadu Censor Board during 2006 to 2009.

She has represented the Indian Youth Congress at international forums like American Council for Young Political Leaders that was held in the US in 2006 and Asian Young Leader's Summit 2009 in Malaysia. She was also selected for Vital-Voice of Asia Asian Women Leaders Meet held in New Delhi in 2010.

Jothimani then unsuccessfully contested the 2011 Tamil Nadu Legislative Assembly election after securing the Indian National Congress' candidature from Karur constituency.

Tamil Nadu state assembly election, 2016 
In July, 2015, Jothimani launched her election campaign from Aravakurichi constituency for 2016 Tamil Nadu Legislative Assembly election. She has intensified the campaign on the ground and through social media as well. She has been meeting various sections of the people in the constituency and called upon them to give a "missed call" if they supported her candidature. Calendars and pamphlets explaining the initiative have been distributed across the constituency. Her Facebook and Twitter account with the hashtag, 'Aravakurichi 2016,' are replete with postings and pictures of her interaction with voters of the constituency. She has also formed youth groups to reach out to the voters.

Between the time the DMK and Congress declared that the national party – Congress would contest from 41 seats and the announcement about which the seats were, there was a rather extended period of silence, filled with suspense. When Aravakurichi did not figure on the Congress list, Jothimani unleashed a volley of strong criticisms and even threatened to contest as an independent candidate. But the alliance leader put its foot down, refusing to concede. For one, this is one of the rare seats that the DMK bagged in the last Assembly election. More importantly, the sitting MLA, the one who is seeking re-election this time, is K C Palanisamy, an important leader in the party affairs in many ways.

After a meeting with her supporters, she said that she has decided not to contest in the Aravakurichi constituency in the overall interest of the Congress party. The Election was about to be held on 16 May 2016. Then the election commission postponed it to 23 May 2016 and again postpone the polling along with Thanjavur Assembly constituencies to 13 June 2016. Finally Election Commission cancelled polls to Aravakurichi and Thanjavur Assembly seats.

2019 Election to the Parliament 

Jothimani attained the Indian National Congress' candidature for the Indian general election, 2019 from Karur constituency  of the Lok Sabha. In what was seen as a major upset by many media outlets and political analyst, Jothimani went on to defeat veteran All India Anna Dravida Munnetra Kazhagam leader, M. Thambidurai who had previously served as Deputy Speaker of the Lok Sabha Speaker and in the Union Cabinet.

Activism

Controversy with BJP Karu Nagarajan 
During a live interview in a private television about the spread of COVID-19 in India on May 18, 2020, a Bharatiya Janata Party spokesperson Karu Nagarajan made sexist remarks against Jothimani when she criticized the Bhartiya Janata party in mishandling the Immigrant crisis during the COVID-19 pandemic in India. Jothimani quit the show on live television claiming that the BJP spokesperson made personal remarks after he was unable to answer her questions. The video went viral and Jothimani received huge support from people. The hashtag  trended on social media.

Elections

Positions held

State level 
 Councillor of K.Paramathi panchayat union for two terms from 1996 to 2006.
 District General Secretary of Karur district Congress from 1997 to 2004.
 Council Member of Tamil Nadu Congress Commeitte from 1998 to 2000.
 Vice President, Tamil Nadu Youth Congress from 2006 to 2008.
 Member, Tamil Nadu Censor Board from 2006 to 2009.

National level 
 Indian Youth Congress National Coordinator- Kerala – 2008 (Appointed through State level talent search by Young Congress MPs).
 Indian Youth Congress general secretary – 2009 to 2012 (Appointed by Rahul Gandhi, through National level talent search).
 State Returning Officer, Youth Congress Election – Kerala (Additional sharge).
 Media panelist on State issues in Indian National Congress.
 2019–present (23 May 2019) Member 17th Lok Sabha - Karur constituency

Books 
 Ottrai Vasanai – Short story collection
 Sithirak Koodu – Novel
 Neer Pirakku Munn (Translated into English as No shortcut to Leadership)

Awards 
 Ilakkiya Chinthanai Award for Best short story, 1999
 Shakthi Award for Best short story collection, 2007

See also 
 P Chidambaram
 Indian Youth Congress
 Rahul Gandhi
 E V K S Elangovan

References

External links 
 Jothimani Facebook
 Jothimani Twitter

1975 births
Living people
Indian Tamil people
Indian National Congress politicians from Tamil Nadu
Women in Tamil Nadu politics
India MPs 2019–present
Tamil writers
Indian Youth Congress
Indian women activists
People from Karur district
Annamalai University alumni
Indian women short story writers
Indian women novelists
Novelists from Tamil Nadu
21st-century Indian short story writers
21st-century Indian novelists
21st-century Indian women writers
Women writers from Tamil Nadu
21st-century Indian women politicians
21st-century Indian politicians